Clive-Warren Nye Harvey-Weeden (born November 22, 1987) is an American basketball player who last played for the South West Slammers of the NBL1 West. He played four seasons of college basketball for Dartmouth College before moving to Europe to begin his professional career. After short stints in Macedonia and Tunisia, Weeden arrived in Australia in 2013 to play for the Slammers of the State Basketball League (SBL), where he played six seasons. He re-joined the Slammers in 2021.

High school career
Weeden attended Nashoba Regional High School in Bolton, Massachusetts and Northfield Mount Hermon School in Northfield, Massachusetts. As a wide receiver and punter, Weeden racked up 450 receiving yards and six touchdowns in his one year of high school football during his sophomore year at Northfield Mount Hermon. Boston College and UConn were among the school's who were intrigued by Weeden's football talent. However, he tore his MCL in track and subsequently missed the whole summer and the beginning of the fall, so he decided to not play football in his junior year.

In October 2006, Weeden committed to the Dartmouth Big Green men's basketball team. Before committing to Dartmouth, Weeden was on Boston College's radar due to his solid grades. Syracuse and Connecticut also made inquiries about Weeden and other coaches would occasionally stop by campus to check him out.

In addition to helping the Northfield Mount Hermon basketball team to 23 wins as a senior, Weeden showed surprising athleticism for someone so tall by leading the Hoggers to a share of the New England Prep School track championship as a senior, placing second in the javelin, second in the triple jump and sixth in the discus.

College career
Weeden played in 25 of the 28 games as a freshman at Dartmouth in 2007–08, starting two and averaging 11.8 minutes per game. He posted a season-high seven rebounds, including five on the offensive glass, against Brown on February 8, 2008. He scored a season-high six points twice, both coming in back-to-back games in late February.

As a sophomore in 2008–09, just as he had as a freshman, the ballhawking Weeden accomplished a rarity, grabbing more offensive rebounds than defensive. On January 3, 2009, he scored a career-high 10 points against Army. Against Penn at the Palestra on February 20, 2009, he was a perfect 3-for-3 from the field, scoring seven points and blocking two shots to help Dartmouth post its first season sweep of the Quakers in a half century. The next night, he grabbed three rebounds off the bench as the Big Green won at Princeton to complete its first sweep of the vaunted "Ps" in two decades.

As a junior in 2009–10, Weeden led Dartmouth in rebounding and ranked 10th in the Ivy League. He also had a team-best 16 blocks. Only two players in the conference averaged more offensive rebounds than Weeden. His first double-digit scoring game came against Furman on November 12, 2009, going 5-for-10 from the floor with his only career three-pointer for 11 points. He also grabbed 11 rebounds for his first career double-double in just 21 minutes on the court. He scored at least 11 points in two of the next three games as well, including a career-high 14 against Vermont along with 10 boards for another double-double. On February 13, 2010, he grabbed a career-high 13 rebounds against Yale.

As a senior in 2010–11, Weeden started every game and finished his career tying a school record with 109 games played. He is also ranked among the top 10 in Dartmouth history in blocked shots with 68. He tied career highs during the season, scoring 14 points against Colgate on November 27 and grabbing 13 rebounds against Yale on February 25. At 6'9", Weeden was the tallest player on a short Big Green team, but foul trouble often relegated him to the bench.

College statistics

|-
| align="left" | 2007–08
| align="left" | Dartmouth
| 25 || 2 || 11.8 || .462 || .000 || .500 || 2.2 || .2 || .2 || .4 || 1.6
|-
| align="left" | 2008–09
| align="left" | Dartmouth
| 28 || 2 || 12.1 || .444 || .000 || .500 || 2.3 || .3 || .1 || .6 || 2.0
|-
| align="left" | 2009–10
| align="left" | Dartmouth
| 28 || 22 || 22.2 || .401 || .500 || .554 || 4.8 || .8 || .5 || .6 || 5.2
|-
| align="left" | 2010–11
| align="left" | Dartmouth
| 28 || 28 || 21.7 || .409 || .000 || .563 || 4.6 || 1.1 || .5 || .9 || 5.1
|- class="sortbottom"
| style="text-align:center;" colspan="2" | Career
| 109 || 54 || 17.1 || .416 || .250 || .543 || 3.5 || .6 || .4 || .6 || 3.6

Professional career

Macedonia and Tunisia (2011–2012)
In September 2011, Weeden signed a contract to play professionally in Macedonia. He joined ABA Strumica, making his debut for the team on October 15, 2011. On December 3, 2011, he scored a season-high 19 points against Kožuv. In his final game for Strumica on December 21, 2011, he recorded a season-high 15 rebounds against Vardar. In 14 games for Strumica, he averaged 9.8 points and 5.7 rebounds in 27.5 minutes per game.

Between January and May 2012, Weeden played in Tunisia for Étoile Sportive du Sahel. He helped the team win the Tunisian Basketball Championship.

Weeden said of his first professional season, "My team in Macedonia was in a struggling situation and things fell apart but my team in Tunisia was one of the best in Africa."

South West Slammers (2013–2018; 2021)
In February 2013, Weeden arrived in Australia to play for the South West Slammers of the State Basketball League (SBL). With Australian citizenship through his mother, Weeden was not classed as an import player. He joined the Slammers keen to spark a revival at the club, who had won the past three SBL wooden spoons. Weeden was a big factor in the Slammers pulling themselves out of the doldrums to return to the playoffs in 2013, only to miss their quarter-final series against the East Perth Eagles, and then end up with a grand final appearance in 2015, of which he also missed. He missed the Slammers' entire playoff run in 2015 after rupturing his ACL in the second last round of the regular season and requiring a knee reconstruction. He returned midway through the 2016 season after 10 months on the sidelines. He came into the 2017 season fully fit and healthy. He served as co-captain of the Slammers in 2015, 2016 and 2017, before becoming sole captain in 2018. He missed time towards the end of the 2018 season due to personal commitments. The final game of the season marked Weeden's 150th for the Slammers. He departed the Slammers following the 2018 season.

In May 2021, Weeden joined the Slammers for the rest of the 2021 NBL1 West season. In eight games, he averaged 4.5 points and 3.75 rebounds per game.

SBL / NBL1 West statistics

Personal
Weeden is the son of Robert and the late Susan Weeden, and has one sister and one brother. Both of his grandfathers were professional tennis players. In 2012, he obtained Australian citizenship through his mother.

References

External links
Clive Weeden at dartmouthsports.com
Clive Weeden at foxsportspulse.com
Clive Weeden at sportstg.com
"Weeden resigns with Slammers" at thewest.com.au
"SW Slammer's Clive Weedon back from a crippling injury and hungry for a win (video)" at au.gwn7.yahoo.com

1987 births
Living people
American expatriate basketball people in Australia
American expatriate basketball people in North Macedonia
American men's basketball players
Basketball players from Massachusetts
Centers (basketball)
Dartmouth Big Green men's basketball players
Northfield Mount Hermon School alumni
People from Stow, Massachusetts
Power forwards (basketball)
Sportspeople from Middlesex County, Massachusetts